Eduardo Jiguchi Machicado (born August 24, 1970) is a retired football defender from Bolivia, who played his entire career in the Liga de Fútbol Profesional Boliviano.

International career
He also played for the Bolivia national team from 1991 to 2002, representing his country in 2 FIFA World Cup qualification matches and at the 1987 FIFA U-16 World Championship.

Notes

References

External links

1970 births
Living people
1991 Copa América players
1997 Copa América players
2001 Copa América players
Association football defenders
Bolivian footballers
Bolivia international footballers
Bolivian Primera División players
Bolivia youth international footballers
C.D. Jorge Wilstermann players
Club Aurora players
Club Bolívar players
Club Destroyers players
Club San José players
The Strongest players
Oriente Petrolero players
People from Obispo Santistevan Province